Chen Shuda (572 - 635), courtesy name Zicong, formally Duke Zhong of Jiang, was an imperial prince of the Chen dynasty, who, after the destruction of Chen, served as an official under the Sui and Tang dynasties, becoming a chancellor during the reigns of the Tang emperors Gaozu and Taizong.

During Chen dynasty 
Chen Shuda was born in 572. He was the 17th of 42 sons of Emperor Xuan of Chen.  His mother was Consort Yuan, a concubine of Emperor Xuan who carried the rank of Zhaorong, the eighth highest rank among imperial consorts, who had two other sons—his older brother Chen Shuwen, later created the Prince of Jinxi, and his younger brother Chen Shutan, later created the Prince of Xinhui.

In 582, just after Emperor Xuan died and was succeeded by Chen Shuda's oldest brother Chen Shubao the Crown Prince, Chen Shubao created Chen Shuda, along with his other brothers Chen Shuyan, Chen Shushen, and Chen Shuyu, princes, and Chen Shuda's title was Prince of Yiyang.  Chen Shuda was also given a minor general title.  In 587, Chen Shubao made him the mayor of the capital Jiankang.  During Chen Shubao's reign, Chen Shuda was one of the officials known for literary talent, and Chen Shubao often invited him, along with those other officials, into the palace to feast, write poems, and recite them with him and some of the concubines with literary talent as well.  Once, he impressed the chancellor Xu Ling by writing a poem that had 10 rhymes during a feast.

During Sui dynasty 
In 589, the Sui dynasty conquered the Chen dynasty, reuniting China proper. Chen Shubao and the rest of the Chen imperial clan, other than Chen Shushen, who continued to resist after Chen Shubao surrendered and who was executed after being captured, were treated well by Emperor Wen of Sui after they were taken to the Sui capital Chang'an.  Chen Shuda entered Sui governmental service as a minor official, although his title at the time is not recorded in history.  During the reign of Emperor Wen's son Emperor Yang, he was made Neishi Sheren, a mid-level official at the legislative bureau of the government (內史省, Neishi Sheng), and later the deputy governor of Jiang Commandery (絳郡, part of modern Yuncheng, Shanxi), acting as governor.

In 617, the Sui general Li Yuan the Duke of Tang rebelled at Taiyuan and advanced toward Chang'an.  When his army arrived at Jiang Commandery, Chen Shuda surrendered the commandery to his forces, and he was made a secretary on Li Yuan's staff and created the Duke of Handong, sharing important secretarial duties with Wen Daya.  It was said that Li Yuan's military correspondences, as well as edicts later issued in the name of Yang You (the grandson of Emperor Yang, whom Li Yuan declared emperor after capturing Chang'an later in 617) announcing general pardons and, later, passing the throne to Li Yuan in 618, were largely written by Chen Shuda.

During Emperor Gaozu's reign 
After Li Yuan assumed the throne in 618, establishing Tang Dynasty as its Emperor Gaozu, Chen Shuda was made the Huangmen Shilang, the deputy head of the government's examination bureau (門下省, Menxia Sheng).  In 619, Emperor Gaozu made him Nayan -- the head of the examination bureau, a post considered one for a chancellor.  In 621, after the title of the head of the examination bureau was changed to Shizhong, he continued to serve as Shizhong.

It was said that Chen was well-spoken and handsome in appearance, and whenever he made an appearance before the emperor, the gentlemen at the capital were all looking at him.  When famed people from south of the Yangtze River (i.e., the former Chen territory) visited Chang'an, he often recommended them for government service.  In 630, Emperor Gaozu created him the greater title of Duke of Jiang.  At one imperial feast, when grapes were served, Chen, instead of eating the grapes, held them in his hand, and when Emperor Gaozu asked him why, he responded, "My mother has a mouth ailment, and I have wanted to get her grapes but could not get them.  I want to hold them and take them back to my mother."  Emperor Gaozu, who thus was reminded of his mother, stated, "It is a good thing you have a mother to take things back to."  He rewarded Chen with silk.

Late in Emperor Gaozu's reign, an intense rivalry developed between his two oldest sons, Li Jiancheng the Crown Prince and Li Shimin the Prince of Qin, as Li Jiancheng, while a capable general himself, was overshadowed by Li Shimin, who had destroyed Tang's major enemies Xue Rengao the Emperor of Qin, Liu Wuzhou the Dingyang Khan, Wang Shichong the Emperor of Zheng, and Dou Jiande the Prince of Xia.  Li Jiancheng and a brother who supported him, Li Yuanji the Prince of Qi, once accused Li Shimin of crimes, and Emperor Gaozu, believing in the accusations, was set to punish Li Shimin, when Chen interceded for Li Shimin, pointing out his great contributions, and Emperor Gaozu did not punish Li Shimin.

During Emperor Taizong's reign 
In 626, Li Shimin, fearing that Li Jiancheng was about to kill him, set an ambush for Li Jiancheng and Li Yuanji at Xuanwu Gate and killed them.  He then effectively forced Emperor Gaozu to create him crown prince and then yield the throne to him (as Emperor Taizong).  Initially, Chen Shuda continued to serve as the head of the examination bureau, but later that year, in the middle of a major governmental reorganization by Emperor Taizong, Chen and another chancellor, Xiao Yu, argued at length before Emperor Taizong, and both were accused of being disrespectful and removed from their offices.  Soon thereafter, Chen Shuda's mother died, and as Chen had previously himself been ill, Emperor Taizong feared for his physical well-being and ordered that guests not be allowed to visit Chen during his mourning.  After he completed the mourning period, Emperor Taizong commissioned him as the commandant at Sui Prefecture (遂州, roughly modern Suining, Sichuan), but he, on account of illness, did not report to Sui Prefecture.  Soon thereafter, Emperor Taizong made him the minister of ceremonies, stating to him, "During the Wude era [(Emperor Gaozu's era name)], I was in danger, but I know that you gave faithful words to the emperor.  I thus commission you thus in return."  Chen responded, "I did not only do this for Your Imperial Majesty, but did so for the state."

At a later point, Chen was accused of sexual immorality.  Emperor Taizong, as Chen was a well-known official, did not want his offense to be made public, and so had him retire with a minor office.  He died in 634 and was initially given the unflattering posthumous name of Miao (繆, "inconsistent").  At a later point, he was posthumously awarded with the title of minister of census and had his posthumous name changed to Zhong (忠, "faithful").

Notes

References

 Book of Chen, vol. 28.
 History of Southern Dynasties, vol. 65.
 Old Book of Tang, vol. 61.
 New Book of Tang, vol. 100.
 Zizhi Tongjian, vols. 184, 185, 187, 188, 191, 192, 194.

572 deaths
635 deaths
Chen dynasty imperial princes
Sui dynasty politicians
Chancellors under Emperor Gaozu of Tang
Chancellors under Emperor Taizong of Tang
7th-century Chinese poets
Chen dynasty poets
Tang dynasty writers
Writers from Nanjing
Politicians from Nanjing
Tang dynasty politicians from Jiangsu
Poets from Jiangsu
Mayors of Nanjing
Transition from Sui to Tang